Pisavaara Strict Nature Reserve (Pisavaaran luonnonpuisto) is a strict nature reserve located in Lapland, Finland. This varied reserve includes the southernmost arctic biotope in Finland, as well as totally unmanaged forests of both southern and northern Finnish types. There is no public access.

References

Strict nature reserves of Finland
Geography of Lapland (Finland)
Tervola